FTLife Insurance Company Limited (FTLife) is one of Hong Kong's life insurance companies and a wholly owned subsidiary of NWS Holdings Limited.

History

In 1994, NZI Life (Bermuda) Limited was acquired and renamed Top Glory Insurance Company (Bermuda) Limited (TGI). In the same year Pacific Century Group became the major shareholder of TGI.

In 1999, the company name was changed into Pacific Century Insurance. In July of the same year the Pacific Century Insurance Holdings Limited (PCIHL) was listed on The Stock Exchange of Hong Kong Limited. Pacific Century Insurance Company Limited (PCI) became the subsidiary operating life insurance and other insurance businesses.

In 2007, Pacific Century Regional Developments entered into an agreement with Fortis on the sale of Pacific Century Insurance. In August 2007, the company renamed as Fortis Insurance Company (Asia) Limited.

In July 2010, Fortis Insurance Company Asia Limited was renamed as Ageas Insurance Company (Asia) Limited to align with the new brand adopted by the parent company Ageas.

In May 2016, JD Group successfully acquired Ageas Insurance Company (Asia) Limited from Ageas Group. In September 2016, Ageas Insurance Company (Asia) Limited was renamed as FTLife Insurance Company Limited.

In November 2019, NWS Holdings Limited completed the acquisition of FTLife.

References

Financial services companies established in 1985
Insurance companies of Hong Kong
Pacific Century Group
Companies formerly listed on the Hong Kong Stock Exchange
1985 establishments in Hong Kong
1999 initial public offerings
1994 mergers and acquisitions
2007 mergers and acquisitions
2015 mergers and acquisitions
2018 mergers and acquisitions